The Book of Souls World Tour was a concert tour by Iron Maiden, held in support of their sixteenth studio album, The Book of Souls. During the first leg of the tour the band played shows in 36 countries across six continents, which included their debut performances in El Salvador, Lithuania and China. With 117 shows, it was the longest tour with Bruce Dickinson on vocals since the "Somewhere on Tour" in 1986–87. The group, their crew and equipment were transported on a customized Boeing 747-400, nicknamed "Ed Force One", which was piloted by vocalist Bruce Dickinson (the first time using the Boeing 747, replaced Boeing 757, which they used on some of their previous tours). The success of the tour led to the live album / video The Book of Souls: Live Chapter, released in 2017.

Background
Iron Maiden's intention to tour in support of The Book of Souls was confirmed with the album's announcement on 18 June 2015. The band's touring plans had to be delayed until 2016 to allow vocalist Bruce Dickinson to recover following treatment for a cancerous tumour found on his tongue. The tour was officially announced with a press release on 25 August, which included a general outline of the band's itinerary with specific dates to be confirmed. Starting in February, the band visited 36 countries throughout North and South America, Japan, China, New Zealand, Australia and South Africa, before finishing in Europe in August. The band's dates in China, El Salvador and Lithuania marked their debut visits to those countries, while their South African shows were their first with Dickinson as vocalist (having previously toured there in 1995).

The first dates to be confirmed were the band's shows in New Zealand, Australia and South Africa, announced 14 September 2015. On 1 October, the group released their US itinerary, which highlighted their Fort Lauderdale performance as the tour's opening concert, with an additional night in Los Angeles added on 13 October. This was followed by their Central and South American dates on 5 and 6 October, which included the announcement of their first ever performance in El Salvador, their Canadian performances on 8 October and an additional show in Mexico City on 26 October. On 12 January 2016, the band announced their debut performances in China in Beijing and Shanghai, followed by the confirmation of their return to Japan, after an eight-year absence, with two nights in Tokyo. The band's debut in El Salvador was reportedly the largest event in the history of the country, with an attendance of 25,000, and the group received a special thanks from the Ministry of Tourism.

The band began announcing their European shows from 7 October 2015, with their Netherlands date the first to be revealed, followed by Ullevi, Sweden on 19 October, Oslo, Norway and Herning, Denmark on 21 October, Berlin, Germany on 23 October, Wrocław, Poland on 26 October. Kaunas, their debut appearance in Lithuania, and Hämeenlinna, Finland on 2 November, Moscow, Russia on 3 November, Prague, Czech Republic on 11 November, Italy on 30 November, Madrid, Spain on 9 December, Luxembourg on 22 January 2016, Slovakia on 10 February, Croatia on 12 February and Seville, Spain on 15 February. The band will play several festivals throughout their European tour, including Graspop Metal Meeting in Belgium, Rock im Revier, Rockavaria and Wacken Open Air in Germany, the Download Festival in Paris, France and Donington, UK, Rock in Vienna, Austria, Sonisphere presents Allment Rockt in Lucerne, Switzerland, VOLT Festival in Sopron, Hungary, Rock in Roma Sonisphere in Italy, Resurrection Fest and Rock Fest in Spain, Rock the City in Bucharest, Romania and Paléo Festival in Nyon, Switzerland.

As with their 2008, 2009 and 2011 tours, the band travelled on their own aircraft, nicknamed "Ed Force One" after the band's mascot, Eddie, although this time using a Boeing 747-400 jumbo jet, provided by Air Atlanta Icelandic, rather than the smaller Boeing 757s which they had previously used. According to Dickinson, a qualified pilot who captained the aeroplane, the larger 747-400 meant that the band were able to travel at faster speeds and for longer periods and were able to carry their equipment without the plane having to undertake extensive modifications, as they had to do with the 757s. Ed Force One carried the band, their crew and over 12 tons of equipment for all of their shows up to and including their concert in Gothenburg, Sweden on 17 June. On 12 March, the plane was involved in a collision with a tow truck on the ground at Comodoro Arturo Merino Benítez International Airport in Santiago, Chile, while being towed for refuelling, injuring two ground tug operators as well as damaging the aircraft's undercarriage and two of its engines. The band made contingency plans to ensure that their schedule was unaffected as the repairs were carried out, which Dickinson stated would take two weeks. On 21 March, the band reported that the repairs had been completed and that Ed Force One would rejoin the group for the remainder of the tour.

In September 2016, the band announced that the tour would continue with European shows in 2017, encompassing Belgium, Germany, the UK and Ireland. In January 2017, the band added a series of North American performances, taking place in June and July 2017. On 17 February, an additional night in New York was added, confirmed as the final concert of the tour. By the tour's conclusion, the band performed 117 shows in 36 countries.

Set

Tying in with the album's title and theme, the stage set was decorated in a manner which mimics Maya architecture. The band's mascot, Eddie, in his Mayan guise from The Book of Souls album cover, appeared at two points during the show: as a walking puppet during "The Book of Souls" and as an inflatable head during "Iron Maiden". In addition, an inflatable goat/devil appeared during "The Number of the Beast".

Reception

Critical response
The tour received positive reviews from critics, with Loudwire stating that Iron Maiden "[show] no sign of age in the slightest and [continue] to demonstrate why they're top live act in heavy metal", while Revolver concluded that their opening performance in Florida was "another memorable performance from the musical giants. Classic heavy metal. Classic Maiden." The band member's individual performances were well-received, with the BrooklynVegan reporting that the band brought "a level of energy and athleticism that you wouldn't think a 40-year-old band could still be capable of", Following his recovery from cancer, particular attention was given to vocalist Bruce Dickinson, with SouthFlorida.com stating that it was "a tour de force for Dickinson", while Loudwire reported that "[his] golden pipes are very much in tact (sic)" and Tulsa World exclaimed that "his interaction with the band members and the crowd makes for some dynamic entertainment". In addition to their vocalist, the other band members received specific praise, with Tulsa World referring to bassist Steve Harris' "sophisticated skills", while SouthFlorida.com commented that "guitarists Adrian Smith, Dave Murray and Janick Gers brought all the necessary firepower to the night."

The tour's stage show was also praised, with Tulsa World describing it as "a beautiful piece of craftsmanship". Revolver deemed the stage show "as impressive as they've ever had with a jungle vibe complete with hanging ropes from the ceiling and fiery tiki torches lit in the background", while The BrooklynVegan stated that it was a "staggering and immersive set design with gorgeous artistry and other gloomy bells and whistles". New Times Broward-Palm Beach highlighted appearances from the band's mascot, Eddie, as well as a horned devil during "The Number of the Beast", as "incredible to see and impressive pieces of this tour's set", while Las Vegas Weekly argued that "the show successfully walked the line between darkness and cheesiness, just as Maiden has been doing for the past four decades."

Commercial performance
The Book of Souls World Tour was ranked at no. 8 in Billboard's 2016 mid-year touring update, with a gross of US$35,055,268 from 34 shows. Pollstar ranked it at no. 13 in their mid-year list of worldwide tours, with a reported $46.4 million gross from 46 concerts. In addition, Pollstar also ranked it at no. 32 in their 2016 mid-year list of North American tours, taking $15.4 million from 17 performances.

In their 2016 Year End list of the Top Worldwide Tours, Pollstar ranked The Book of Souls World Tour at no. 19 with a gross of US$62.9 million based on 59 shows, while their list of North American tours placed the band at no. 80 with a gross of $15.3 million based on 17 shows.

In Pollstar's 2017 Mid-Year list of the Top Worldwide Tours, the tour was ranked no. 29 with a gross of US$27.9 million from 33 shows. At the end of 2017, the tour placed at number 56 on Pollstar's "2017 Year-End Top 100 Worldwide Tours" list, grossing $37.3 million with a total attendance of 553,067 people on 45 shows.

Opening acts

2016
The Raven Age throughout the tour.
Anthrax in Mexico, El Salvador, Costa Rica, Chile, Argentina, Brazil, Poland and Italy.
Araña in El Salvador.
Ghost (Swedish band) in Berlin, Norway and Denmark.
Opeth in Sweden.
Sabaton in Finland, Slovakia and Italy.
Stratovarius in Finland.
Amon Amarth in Finland.

2017
Shinedown in Europe.
Ghost in North America.
Exodus in San Bernardino.
Kamelot in San Bernardino.

Setlist
Speaking about the setlist prior to the tour, guitarist Janick Gers stated that the band will play "six or seven" tracks from The Book of Souls and "pepper it with older songs so everybody gets to enjoy the gig." Gers also suggested that "Hallowed Be Thy Name" (from The Number of the Beast, 1982) would return to the show, following its absence during the Maiden England World Tour 2012–14, and that "The Trooper" (from Piece of Mind, 1983) would also be performed. In an additional interview, Bruce Dickinson revealed that either "Run to the Hills" or The Number of the Beast" (both concert staples from The Number of the Beast) would be excluded.

Tour dates

Personnel
(Credits taken from the official tour programme.)

Iron Maiden
 Bruce Dickinson – lead vocals
 Dave Murray – guitar
 Adrian Smith – guitar, vocals and backing vocals
 Janick Gers – guitar
 Steve Harris – bass guitar, backing vocals
 Nicko McBrain – drums

Management
Rod Smallwood
Andy Taylor

Booking agents
Rick Roskin at CAA (North America)
John Jackson at K2 Agency Ltd. (rest of the world)
Dave Shack

Intro tape production
Llexi Leon – director
Yaya Leone – producer
Joe Plant – lead animation

Crew

Dick Bell – production consultant
Ian Day – tour director
John Collins – tour manager
Nick Farrington – tour manager
Patrick Ledwith – production manager
Zeb Minto – production coordinator
Kerry Harris – production assistant
Rik Benbow – stage manager
Martin Walker – sound engineer
Rob Coleman – lighting designer
Antti Saari – lighting engineer
Michael Mule – monitor engineer
Steve Smith – Steve Harris' monitor engineer
Jonathan Beswick – video director
Ryan Titley – audiovisual director
Jeff Weir – head of security
Peter Lokrantz – security
Natasha De Sampayo – wardrobe
Michael Kenney – Steve Harris' guitar technician and keyboards
Sean Brady – Adrian Smith's guitar technician
Colin Price – Dave Murray's guitar technician
Eddie Marsh – Janick Gers' guitar technician
Charlie Charlesworth – Nicko McBrain's drum technician
Ian Walsh – sound technician (2016)
Phil Shenton – sound technician (2017)
Omar Franchi – rigger (2016)
Steve Armstrong – head rigger (2017)
Ashley Groom – set carpenter
Philip Stewart – set carpenter
Eoin McBrien – set carpenter
Jude Aflalo – set carpenter
Richard Trow – line array engineer (2016)
Mike Hackman – audio system technician (2017)
Adam Ford – animatronics technician
Ian Evans – merchandiser
Keith Maxwell – pyrotechnics
Eric Muccio – pyrotechnics
Jeremy Smith – freight director (2016)
Colette Shryane-Smith – head caterer / catering coordinator
Alicia Boardman – caterer (2017)
Alison Higgins – caterer (2017)
David Lesh – caterer (2017)
Ed Stewart-Lockhart – management liaison
Gareth Lewis – sound crew (2017)
Eoin O'Cinnseala – sound crew (2017)
Kyle Carter – sound crew (2017)
Scott Walsh – lighting crew (2017)
Simon Lake – lighting crew (2017)
Neil Johnson – lighting crew (2017)
Mark Cooper – lighting crew (2017)
Graham Hill – lighting crew (2017)
John Dall – lighting crew (2017)
Rod Martin – video crew (2017)
Robyn Tearle – video crew (2017)
Luke Butler – video crew (2017)
Paul Brierly – lead lorry driver (2017)
Rob Campbell – lorry driver (2017)
Brian Taplin – lorry driver (2017)
Rachel Shadwick – lorry driver (2017)
Steve Pearce – lorry driver (2017)
Richard Batchelder – lorry driver (2017)
Julian Meynell – lorry driver (2017)
Paul Ramm – lorry driver (2017)
Tony Allard – lorry driver (2017)
Mark Herrning – nightliner driver (2017)
Michael McCarthy – nightliner driver (2017)
Brenton Andriske – nightliner driver (2017)

Notes

References

External links
 Official Iron Maiden website
 The Book of Souls World Tour dates (2016)
 The Book of Souls World Tour dates (2017)

2016 concert tours
2017 concert tours
Iron Maiden concert tours